Thrashback is the sixth full-length studio album by American thrash metal band Whiplash. It was released via Massacre Records and follows the previous year's offering, Sit Stand Kneel Prey.

The album marked a return to the three-piece line-up which recorded the band's first two albums between 1985 and 1987 – famously all called Tony. In 1999, Massacre Records released a compilation of previously unavailable demo and live tracks, entitled Messages in Blood, before the untimely death of Tony Bono.

Loudwire named Thrashback the best thrash metal album of 1998.

Track listing
"Temple of Punishment"  – 3:49  
"Stab"  – 2:43  
"This"  – 4:13  
"Killing on Monroe Street"  – 3:56  
"King with the Axe"  – 5:44  
"Strike Me Blind"  – 2:26  
"Memory Serves"  – 4:24  
"Resurrection Chair"  – 3:11  
"House with No Doors"  – 4:43  
"Thrash 'til Death"  – 2:36  
"Nails in Me Deep"  – 4:07

Credits
 Tony Portaro – vocals, guitar
 Tony Bono – bass
 Tony Scaglione – drums
Michael Pinnella – keyboards on track 6
Michael Romeo  – guitar solo on track 6

References

External links
Massacre Records album page
Roadrunner Records band page
BNR Metal discography page
Encyclopaedia Metallum album entry

1998 albums
Whiplash (band) albums
Massacre Records albums